Listwanite (also sometimes spelled listvenite, listvanite, or listwaenite) is a rock type that forms when the groundmass of ultramafic rocks, most commonly mantle peridotites, is partially altered to carbonate minerals and cut by ubiquitous carbonate veins containing one or more of magnesite, calcite, dolomite, ankerite, and/or siderite. Original pyroxene and olivine in the peridotite are commonly altered to Mg- or Ca-carbonate and hydrous Mg-silicates, such as serpentine and talc.  Complete carbonation of peridotite means that every single atom of magnesium and calcium as well as some of the iron atoms have combined with CO2 to form secondary carbonate minerals such a magnesite, calcite, and siderite, while the remaining silica atoms, formerly found in pyroxene and olivine (prior to alteration), are found in quartz, serpentine, and talc. Thus, in terms of bulk mineralogy, listwanites consist primarily of quartz (often of a rusty red colour), carbonate, serpentine, talc, ± mariposite/fuchsite (i.e., Cr-muscovite) ± gold.

Formation
Geologists are still studying how listwanites form, but they likely form through the reaction of CO2-rich fluids with peridotites at approximately 50 to 200°C. Faults and fractures permit the percolation of the CO2-rich fluids through peridotite, so the formation of listwanites is generally considered to be structurally controlled.

CO2 content
Listwanites are important rocks to study for a number of reasons. First of all, listwanites contain large amounts of CO2 which originated from fluids that is now stored in solid mineral form. Recently, geologists and other scientists have been investigating the potential of storing CO2 in solid minerals (which are more stable than CO2 stored as a liquid or gas) through carbonation of mafic and ultramafic rocks. Mafic and ultramafic rocks take up significant CO2 through their natural alteration processes. However, the natural carbonation rates of these rocks are too slow to significantly offset anthropogenic CO2 emissions. Therefore, scientists are currently investigating if it is possible to geoengineer CO2 uptake in mafic and ultramafic rocks so that this CO2 uptake happens more quickly. This could be done, perhaps, by fracturing and heating and injection of CO2-rich fluids. This is already being tested in mafic basalts through the CarbFix Project in Iceland and ultramafic peridotite through 44.01 Project in the Semail Ophiolite of Oman.

In addition to the recent interest in listwanites for carbon sequestration efforts, listwanites are also important because they are often associated with economic mineral deposits, particularly gold deposits.

References

See also
 Metasomatism

Plutonic rocks
Metamorphic rocks